2018 in Korea may refer to:
2018 in North Korea
2018 in South Korea